The 23rd Bomb Squadron is a United States Air Force unit, assigned to the 5th Bomb Wing.  It is stationed at Minot Air Force Base, North Dakota.  The mission of the squadron is to fly the Boeing B-52H Stratofortress strategic bomber. The men and women of the "Bomber Barons" stand ready to project global power on a daily basis in both conventional and nuclear warfare.

The squadron is one of the oldest in the United States Air Force, dating to 16 June 1917, when it was organized at Kelly Field, Texas. It deployed to England as part of the American Expeditionary Forces, being engaged as an aircraft repair squadron during World War I. The squadron saw combat during World War II, and became part of the Strategic Air Command (SAC) during the Cold War.

History

World War I 
Originally organized at Camp Kelly, Texas on 16 June 1917 as the 18th Aero Squadron but redesignated the 23rd Aero Squadron six days later. Arriving in late July, 1918, in Britain, it started training before going to France, where it arrived on Armistice day. It was stationed at the Air Service Replacement Concentration Barracks St. Maixent Replacement Barracks until c. 29 January 1919, then moved to Saint-Nazaire, from where it sailed back to US on 20 February.  The squadron arrived at the port of embarkation in March and was demobilized there.

Inter-war years
The 23rd Bombardment Squadron was born in 1921 and in April 1924 was consolidated with the World War I 23rd Aero Squadron.  It spent the decades of the 1920s and 1930s stationed in Hawaii.  There, the squadron flew a number of bomber types, most notably the Keystone bomber series and later the Douglas B-18 Bolo.  It was during the squadron's stay in Hawaii that the event signified by the squadron emblem took place. On 27 December 1935, the Mauna Loa volcano on the island of Hawaii erupted, threatening the city of Hilo.  Six Keystones of the 23rd used precision bombing tactics to drop twenty 600-pound bombs in the path of the volcano's lava flow, thus saving the city of Hilo by diverting the lava away from the city.

World War II
Part of the 5th Bombardment Group, the 23rd fought its way across the Southwest Pacific during World War II.  The 23rd initially flew Boeing B-17E Flying Fortresses into combat, replacing those with Consolidated B-24 Liberators by early 1943.  Long-range over-water missions were the squadron's forte, and in April 1944 the squadron won its first of two Distinguished Unit Citation (DUC)s for flying the longest over-water bombing mission ever flown to date, some 1,300 miles each way, to bomb the Japanese base at Woleai Island.  After winning a second DUC for another long range strike against oil refineries on Borneo on 30 September 1944, the 23rd found itself in the Philippines at the close of the war.

Cold War
After a brief period in the Far East after the war, the 23rd Strategic Reconnaissance Squadron relocated to Travis Air Force Base, Calif ornia, in 1949. There, the squadron flew global strategic reconnaissance missions with Boeing RB-29 Superfortresses from 1949 to 1951, Convair RB-36F Peacemakers from 1951 to 1953, and RB-36Hs from 1953 to 1955. On 1 October 1955, the squadron was again redesignated the 23rd Bombardment Squadron and reverted to training for long range nuclear strike missions with the same RB-36Hs.  On 13 February 1959, the 23rd entered the jet age when it received its first Boeing B-52G Stratofortress and also entered the missile age, as the B-52Gs were equipped with the AGM-28 Hound Dog standoff missile and the ADM-20 Quail decoy missile. The squadron flew the B-52G from Travis until July 1968.

On 25 July 1968, the 23rd moved, without personnel or equipment, to Minot Air Force Base, North Dakota, where it absorbed the personnel, equipment, and B-52H bombers of the inactivating 720th Bombardment Squadron. The 23rd has been combat ready in B-52Hs since that time, continuously adding improvements in avionics, weapons, and tactics to its arsenal. In 1973, the squadron was the first unit to receive the AGM-69 SRAM (Short Range Attack Missile). In 1980, the 23rd gained the offensive avionics system, and led Strategic Air Command's venture into modern conventional war fighting as the lead unit for the Strategic Projection Force, in support of the U.S. Rapid Deployment Force. During the 1980s, the squadron pioneered night vision goggle tactics. The 23rd added the AGM-86B Air Launched Cruise Missile in 1989 and the AGM-129 Advanced Cruise Missile in 1994.

Post-Cold War
The squadron, along with other bomber units provide aircraft and personnel for regular rotational deployments to Andersen Air Force Base, Guam part of the U.S. Pacific Command's continuous bomber presence since 2004.

July 2012 see the 23rd Bomb Squadron deploy aircraft and personnel to Nellis AFB for Exercise Red Flag 12–4.

June 2016 three of the unit's B-52H bombers deployed to RAF Fairford for NATO Maritime exercise "BALTOPS" and for JTAC (Joint Terminal Attack Controller) exercise "Saber Strike".

26 March 2019 the 23rd BS assigned to the 23rd Expeditionary Bomber Squadron deployed two B-52 Stratofortresses from Andersen Air Force Base, Guam, to Royal Australian Air Force Base Darwin, Australia to participate in the biennial exercise Diamond Shield 2019.

Lineage
 23rd Aero Squadron
 Organized as the 18th Aero Squadron on 16 June 1917
 Redesignated 23rd Aero Squadron (Repair) on 22 June 1917
 Demobilized on 22 March 1919
 Reconstituted and consolidated with the 23rd Bombardment Squadron on 8 April 1924

 23rd Bomb Squadron
 Authorized as the 23rd Squadron on 30 August 1921
 Organized on 1 October 1921
 Redesignated 23rd Bombardment Squadron on 25 January 1923
 Consolidated with the 23rd Aero Squadronon 8 April 1924
 Redesignated 23rd Bombardment Squadron (Medium) on 6 December 1939
 Redesignated 23rd Bombardment Squadron (Heavy) on 20 November 1940
 Redesignated 23rd Bombardment Squadron, Heavy on 6 March 1944
 Redesignated 23rd Bombardment Squadron, Very Heavy on 30 April 1946
 Inactivated on 10 March 1947
 Redesignated 23rd Reconnaissance Squadron, Very Long Range, Photographic on 16 September 1947
 Activated on 20 October 1947
 Redesignated 23rd Strategic Reconnaissance Squadron, Photographic on 16 June 1949
 Redesignated 23rd Strategic Reconnaissance Squadron, Heavy on 14 November 1950
 Redesignated 23rd Bombardment Squadron, Heavy on 1 October 1955
 Redesignated 23rd Bomb Squadron on 1 September 1991

Assignments
 Unknown, 16 June 1917 – 22 March 1919
 Ninth Corps Area, 1 October 1921
 5th Group (Observation) (later 5th Group (Pursuit and Bombardment); 5th Group (Composite), 5th Composite Group), 29 March 1922
 19th Bombardment Group, 8 May 1929 (attached to 5th Composite Group (later 5th Bombardment Group))
 5th Bombardment Group, 12 October 1938 – 10 March 1947
 5th Reconnaissance Group, (later 5th Strategic Reconnaissance Group), 20 October 1947 (attached to 71st Tactical Reconnaissance Wing, 18–24 August 1948; 32d Composite Wing, 24 August 1948 – 16 March 1949; 55th Strategic Reconnaissance Wing, 1–17 June 1949; 5th Strategic Reconnaissance Wing after 10 February 1951)
 5th Strategic Reconnaissance Wing (later 5th Bombardment Wing), 16 June 1952
 5th Operations Group, 1 September 1991 – present

Stations

 Camp Kelly (later Kelly Field), Texas, 16 June 1917
 Hazelhurst Field, New York, 5 September 1917 – 6 July 1918
 Thetford Airdrome, England, c. 25 July 1918
 Detachments at Hucknall Torkard and Salisbury, c. 18 August-c. 5 November 1918
 Duxford Aerodrome, England, 2 September 1918
 Codford Airdrome, England, 5 November 1918
 Cherbourg Naval Base, France, 11 November 1918
 St. Maixent Replacement Barracks, France, 18 November 1918
 Saint-Nazaire, France, c. 29 January-20 February 1919
 Garden City, New York, c. 8–22 March 1919
 March Field, California, 1 October 1921 – 21 March 1922
 Luke Field, Hawaii, 29 March 1922
 Hickam Field, Hawaii, 1 January 1939
 Mokuleia Airfield, Hawaii, 24 March–3 November 1942
 Pallikulo Bay Airfield, Espiritu Santo, New Hebrides, 1 December 1942 – 3 January 1944
 Air echelon operated from Henderson Field, Guadalcanal, Solomon Islands, 31 March-24 August 1943, and 21 October-7 December 1943

 Munda Airfield, New Georgia, Solomon Islands, 9 January 1944
 Momote Airfield, Los Negros, Admiralty Islands, 16 April 1944
 Wakde Airfield, Netherlands East Indies, c. 20 August 1944
 Kornasoren Airfield, Noemfoor, Schouten Islands, c. 30 September 1944
 Wama Airfield, Morotai, Netherlands East Indies, c. 16 October 1944
 Guiuan Airfield, Samar, Philippines, 20 February 1945
 Clark Field, Luzon, Philippines, December 1945 – 10 March 1947
 Clark Field, Luzon, Philippines, 20 October 1947
 Kadena Air Base, Okinawa, 15 May 1948
 Yokota Air Base, Japan, 16 March-2 May 1949
 Fairfield-Suisun Air Force Base, California, 19 May 1949
 Topeka Air Force Base (later Forbes AFB), Kansas, 1 June 1949
 Mountain Home Air Force Base, Idaho, 25 June 1949
 Fairfield-Suisun Air Force Base (later Travis AFB), California, 1 November 1949 (deployed to Andersen Air Force Base, Guam, 14 January-12 April 1955
 Minot Air Force Base, North Dakota, 25 July 1968 – present

Aircraft

 Martin NBS-1, 1922-1929
 Curtiss JN-6, 1922-1929
 Dayton-Wright DH-4, 1922-1929
 Keystone B-4, 1929-1937
 Keystone B-5, 1929-1937
 Keystone LB-6, 1929-1937
 Martin B-12, 1937–1939
 Douglas B-18 Bolo, 1938–1942
 Boeing B-17 Flying Fortress, 1941–1943, 1947–1948
 Consolidated B-24 Liberator, 1943–1945
 Curtiss C-46 Commando, 1947–1948
 Boeing FB-17 Flying Fortress, 1947–1948
 Boeing F-2 Flying Fortress, 1947–1948
 Boeing RB-29 Superfortress, 1948–1951
 Convair RB-36 Peacekeeper, 1951–1958
 Convair B-36 Peacekeeper, 1955–1958
 Boeing B-52 Stratofortress, 1959–present

See also

 List of American Aero Squadrons
 List of B-52 Units of the United States Air Force

References
 Explanatory notes

 Citations

Bibliography

 
 
 
 

 Further reading
 
 

023
023
023
023
023